Maria  is a 2003 Romanian-French-German drama film directed by Călin Peter Netzer. The film won three awards at the 2003 Locarno International Film Festival.

Cast 
 Diana Dumbrava - Maria
 Horațiu Mălăele - Milco
 Șerban Ionescu - Ion
 Luminița Gheorghiu - Maia
 Rona Hartner - Nuti
 Florin Călinescu - Superviser
 Florin Zamfirescu - Ahmed
  - Officer

References

External links 

2003 drama films
2003 films
Romanian drama films
French drama films
German drama films
2000s French films
2000s German films